Oreobates choristolemma is a species of frog in the family Strabomantidae. It is endemic to Bolivia where it is known from its type locality, Serranía de Bella Vista in the Caranavi Province as well as from Sud Yungas Province (both in La Paz Department) and from Chapare Province in the Cochabamba Department.

Description
The head is large and wider than long; the snout is short. The dorsum is brown with darker markings; the skin is granular, with round keratinized granules and small and large warts.

Habitat
Its natural habitat is the humid Yungas forest. The altitudinal range is  asl. The frogs in the type locality were found on the ground near rocky seeps along a densely forested hillside parallel to a large river.

References

choristolemma
Amphibians of Bolivia
Endemic fauna of Bolivia
Taxonomy articles created by Polbot
Amphibians described in 2005